Clara-Lane Lens  is a Belgian painter, so far particularly known for focussing on portraits of androgynous personas. At the age of 17 she had a first solo exhibition in Brussels (BE). Genderless, the theme of that expo stays the inspiration for most of her works upon today.

Astrid Verreycken in 254Forest: "Clara-Lane Lens paints using a classic imagery. Her works veers between the directness of a quick snapshot and an extensive study of the human body. All figures share something similar, beautiful but introvert. They are inward-looking, lost in thought. But there is also a kind of physical absence. She deliberately omits the characteristics that could reveal a character's gender. Spectators are regularly misled, yet precisely that's the attraction in her work. As you are left with the sense that something has eluded you."

Clara-Lane Lens currently lives and works at her atelier in Berlin (DE).

Biography 
Clara-Lane Lens was born in Brussels (BE). She did study at Luca, School of Arts, Ghent (BE). From 2019 on, immediately after obtaining her master's degree in the Arts, she moved to live and work in Berlin (DE).

Cooperations
 In 2006 Clara-Lane Lens was introduced to the screen as a child actress (role The Whisper Kid) in the art film 'Love is the only master I'll serve,' world premiering at the Brooklyn Film Festival (BFF), New York
 In 2015 her painting The Unknown Soldier was used as front cover for the double CD Shell Shock (opera) by Nick Cave & Nicholas Lens, Universal Music Distribution published by Mute Records, London.
 Besides being mostly known as a painter, in 2020 Clara-Lane Lens performed as well as solo singer and speaker on all twelve tracks of the cd L.I.T.A.N.I.E.S, a recorded album of the trance-chamber opera written and produced by Nick Cave and Nicholas Lens. The CD was released and distributed by Deutsche Grammophon and published by Mute Records, London.

Exhibitions and projects

 2015 Visceral, Barcelona (ES), group
 2018 Teerling, In de Ruimte, Ghent (BE), group
 2018 SOLO EXHIBITION, Genderless, Le Lac, Brussels (BE)
 2018 This thing in Aalst, Huis de Bolle, Aalst (BE), group
 2018 Exhibition Fabrik, Leuven (BE), group
 2019 Voor De Kat Zijn Viool, Nucleo Lindelei, Ghent (BE), group
 2019 Braises de Satin -Maxence, publication CL-LL
 2019 New Saints, Waldburger Wouters Gallery, Brussels (BE), group
 2020 Experimental, Basement Berlin (DE), group
 2020 These Selves, Pilar, Brussels (BE), group 
 2020 Watering plants, Spoiler Zone, Berlin (DE), group
 2020 SOLO EXHIBITION, They never used to talk much, 254Forest, Brussels (BE)
 2020 Community Exhibition Subbacultcha Magazine, De Studio, Antwerp (BE), group
 2021 Grove Collective, London (EN), group
 2021 Nationale 8 Gallery, Brussels (BE), Brussels GalleryWeekend duo
 2021 SOLO EXHIBITION Moon in Vertigo, That's what x said, Brussels(BE)
 2021 Infinite Discontinuity, SAO festival, Farrera (ES), group 
 2021 Have we met? Backhaus Project (Grove Collective), Berlin (DE), duo
 2022 Friends of Ruby, Ruby Gallery, Brussels (BE), group
 2022 SOLO EXHIBITION, Tell us we belong, Silvestri Galleria, Madrid (ES)

Artistic Residencies 
 2020 Banditto Residency, Montepulciano (IT)
 2021 Can Centre d'Art i Natura, Farrera (ES)

References

External links
Clara-Lane Lens
Clara-Lane Lens exhibits a body of many selves at 254Forest 
Alternative Realities - Clara-Lane Lens 
An Interview with the Painter Clara-Lane Lens 
Masks off: Clara-Lane Lens reveals her take on the corona crisis 
Clara-Lane Lens - Self-portrait after a quarantine fight 
Clara-Lane Lens, de onpeilbare wereld achter een blik 
New Masters: Clara-Lane Lens - New Masters 
Nick Cave and Nicholas Lens release L.I.T.A.N.I.E.S

1997 births
Living people
People from Brussels
Belgian painters
Contemporary painters
Belgian contemporary artists
Album-cover and concert-poster artists